Plamen Aleksandrov Panayotov (born 20 January 1958) is a Bulgarian politician and academic who served as deputy Prime Minister in charge of European integration in the Sakskoburggotski cabinet between 2003 and 2005.

Life 
Born in Sliven, Panayotov graduated from the juridical faculty of Sofia University in 1983 with a degree in legal studies. He subsequently earned a doctorate and became a professor of criminal law in 2012.

In 2001, Panayotov was elected to the National Parliament and was chosen as the chairman of the parliamentary group of the NDSV, a position that he held until he assumed a government position on 17 July 2003. Panayotov left NDSV in 2007 and entered the ranks of Bulgarian New Democracy (Bulgarian: Българска нова демокрация).

References 

Academic staff of Sofia University
1958 births
Living people
Bulgarian politicians
People from Sliven
Government ministers of Bulgaria
Members of the National Assembly (Bulgaria)
National Movement for Stability and Progress politicians
Sofia University alumni